Frederick Alexander Davies was an English amateur footballer who played in the Football League for Clapton Orient as an outside left.

References 

English footballers

Clapton Orient F.C. wartime guest players
English Football League players
Year of death missing
Place of death missing
Association football outside forwards
1913 births
People from Hackney, London
Leyton Orient F.C. players
Walthamstow Avenue F.C. players